Bushfield is a surname. Notable people with the surname include:

Harlan J. Bushfield (1882–1948), American politician
Rory Bushfield (born 1983), Canadian professional skier, filmmaker, and reality show star
Vera C. Bushfield (1889–1976), American politician

See also
Bushfield, Victoria
Bushfield (Mount Holly, Virginia)
Ormiston Bushfield Academy, formerly known as the Bushfield Community College